Deskin Green (January 20, 1847 – February 27, 1918) was an American politician who, from 1908 to 1910, served as a member of the Virginia House of Delegates, representing the counties of Tazewell and Buchanan.

References

External links
 
 

1847 births
1918 deaths
Republican Party members of the Virginia House of Delegates
20th-century American politicians
People from Tazewell, Virginia